MFK Kravaře is a Czech football club located in the town of Kravaře in the Moravian-Silesian Region. As of 2021/22, it plays in the sixth tier of Czech football. The club has taken part in the Czech Cup numerous times, reaching the second round in 1998–99.

The club operated with the lowest budget of all clubs competing in the Czech Fourth Division in the 2012–13 season. They were relegated at the end of the season.

Historical names 

 1923 – SK Kravař (Sportovní klub Kravař)
 1945 – SK Kravaře (Sportovní klub Kravaře)
 1948 – Sokol Kravaře
 1950 – Traktor Kravaře
 1953 – TJ Sokol Kravaře (Tělovýchovná jednota Kravaře)
 1994 – SK Kravaře (Sportovní klub Kravaře)
 2014 – MFK Kravaře (Městský fotbalový klub Kravaře)

References

External links
 

Football clubs in the Czech Republic
Association football clubs established in 1923
Opava District